Prince Michał Kazimierz Radziwiłł (26 October 1625 – 14 November 1680) was a Polish–Lithuanian noble and magnate. He is sometimes referred to as the first Michał Kazimierz Radziwiłł, to distinguish him from the other member of his family to use the name.

He held the following titles: Majorat of Nieśwież, Master of the Pantry of Lithuania (since 1652), Carver of Lithuania (since 1653), Cupbearer of Lithuania (since 1656), castellan of Vilnius (since 1661), Voivode of the Vilnius Voivodeship (since 1667), Deputy Chancellor of Lithuania (1668) and Field Hetman of Lithuania. He was also a starost of Upytė, Przemyśl, Człuchów, Kamieniec, Chojnice, Lida, Telšiai, Rabsztyn, Choteń, Homel, Oster, Gulbin, and several other towns in the Polish–Lithuanian Commonwealth.

Between 2 May and 18 July 1661, he served as the Marshal of the ordinary Sejm held in Warsaw. He married Katarzyna Sobieska, the sister of the King of Poland Jan III Sobieski on 16 June 1658.

Unlike his cousins, Janusz Radziwiłł and Bogusław Radziwiłł, he was one of the members of the Radziwiłł family who valiantly fought in the defence of the Polish–Lithuanian Commonwealth during The Deluge.

1625 births
1680 deaths
People from Nesvizh
Michal Kazimierz Radziwill
Field Hetmans of the Grand Duchy of Lithuania
Deputy Chancellors of the Grand Duchy of Lithuania
Voivode of Vilnius